Six Flags Atlantis (later operated as Atlantis the Water Kingdom) was a water park in Hollywood, Florida, that occupied 65 acres on the southeastern intersection of Stirling Road (State Road 848) and I-95. 
  
The park included a wave pool, a lake with water ski shows, a seven-story slide tower, picnic area, stores and arcades, shows, and activities for all ages.

History 
Begun as a private venture originally known as "Atlantis the Water Kingdom", funding ran out before construction ended.  The park sat partially completed for several months before Six Flags opened "Six Flags Atlantis" in 1983. 

In 1989 the park was sold. The new owners revived the original name, "Atlantis the Water Kingdom", and successfully reconfigured Atlantis as a smaller, more efficient park. Following damage during Hurricane Andrew in 1992, the park closed and the assets were auctioned off.

Today 
Today most of the area is now occupied by retail shopping (Oakwood Plaza). A CITY Furniture (previously Kmart) rests where the wave pool was once located. The functional submarine once present in the Atlantis parking lot, formerly known as the Submanaut, could at one point still be seen at Grand Prix Race-O-Rama (Then a Boomers!, now Dania Pointe) a few blocks north of the park. It has since been renamed the Margenaut under its current owner Margen Internacional, according to a document from the NOAA Central Library. Its current physical location, however, remains unknown.

See also
 List of water parks

Other resources 
The Unofficial Atlantis Memorial has more history, some photos, and memorabilia.

Defunct amusement parks in Florida
Atlantis
1983 establishments in Florida
Buildings and structures in Broward County, Florida
1992 disestablishments in Florida
Water parks in Florida